Timothy Fisher may refer to:
 Timothy S. Fisher, American educator, engineer and expert in the application of nanotechnologies
 Timothy Fisher (lawyer), dean emeritus and professor of law

See also
 Tim Fischer, Australian politician and diplomat
 Tim Fischer (wrestler), American professional wrestler